Honz is a German surname. Notable people with the surname include:

Herbert Honz (born 1942), German cyclist
Karl Honz (born 1951), West German sprinter

German-language surnames